Piper abalienatum is a species of plant in the genus Piper. It was discovered by Trel. in 1921. It only occurs in Mexico (Jalisco and Michoacán)

References

abalienatum
Flora of Mexico
Plants described in 1921
Taxa named by William Trelease